Ricardo Jorge Freitas Lopes (born 31 December 1968) is a Portuguese former footballer who played as a winger.

Club career
Born in Luanda, Portuguese Angola to Portuguese settlers, Lopes spent ten seasons in the latter nation's Primeira Liga, amassing totals of 137 matches and 25 goals in representation of Boavista FC, C.F. Estrela da Amadora (two spells), F.C. Penafiel, Vitória S.C. and  G.D. Chaves.

In 1990, whilst at the service of Estrela, he helped the club win its first and only Taça de Portugal, scoring in the replay match in a 2–0 win against S.C. Farense.

Honours
Estrela Amadora
Taça de Portugal: 1989–90

References

External links
 
 

1968 births
Living people
Angolan people of Portuguese descent
Footballers from Luanda
Portuguese footballers
Association football wingers
Primeira Liga players
Liga Portugal 2 players
Boavista F.C. players
Leixões S.C. players
C.F. Estrela da Amadora players
F.C. Penafiel players
Vitória S.C. players
G.D. Chaves players
Portugal under-21 international footballers